Emre Gönensay (born 1937) is a Turkish politician. He served as Minister of Foreign Affairs of Turkey in 1996 and is a member of the True Path Party.

Biography
He was born in 1937. He finished his high school education at Robert College in Istanbul. He left for the United States and earned a master's degree from Columbia University. Then he acquired a doctorate degree from the London School of Economics. After a while he returned to Turkey and continued his career as a professor of economics at Boğaziçi University.

References
 Biyografi.net - Biography of Emre Gönensay

1937 births
Living people
Columbia University alumni
Alumni of the London School of Economics
Ministers of Foreign Affairs of Turkey
Democrat Party (Turkey, current) politicians
Members of the 20th Parliament of Turkey